Group D of the 2012 Africa Cup of Nations ran from 24 January until 1 February. It consisted of Botswana, Ghana, Guinea and Mali. The matches were held in Gabon. Ghana and Mali progressed to the quarterfinals.

Standings

All times are West Africa Time (UTC+1).

Ghana vs. Botswana

Assistant referees:
Djibril Camara (Senegal)
Redouane Achik (Morocco)
Fourth official:
Bouchaïb El Ahrach (Morocco)

Mali vs. Guinea

Assistant referees:
Bechir Hassani (Tunisia)
Felicien Kabanda (Rwanda)
Fourth official:
Eric Otogo-Castane (Gabon)

Botswana vs. Guinea

Assistant referees:
Bechir Hassani (Tunisia)
Theophile Vinga (Gabon)
Fourth official:
Eddy Maillet (Seychelles)

Ghana vs. Mali

Assistant referees:
Abdelhak Etchiali (Algeria)
Yanoussa Moussa (Cameroon)
Fourth official:
Hamada Nampiandraza (Madagascar)

Botswana vs. Mali

Assistant referees:
Moffat Champiti (Malawi)
Balkrishna Bootun (Mauritius)
Fourth official:
Djamel Haimoudi (Algeria)

Ghana vs. Guinea

Assistant referees:
Songuifolo Yeo (Ivory Coast)
Zakhele Siwela (South Africa)
Fourth official:
Bakary Gassama (Gambia)

References

External links
Official website

2012 Africa Cup of Nations